Railway Land, Lewes is a   Local Nature Reserve in Lewes in East Sussex. It is owned by Lewes District Council and managed by the council and the Railway Land Wildlife Trust.

This former railway goods yard has diverse habitats including grassland, wet willow woodland, floodplain grazing meadows, reedbeds, a network of drainage ditches and a tidal winterbourne stream. Bird species include woodpeckers, common kestrels and common kingfishers.

There is access from Railway Lane.

References

Local Nature Reserves in East Sussex